Choi Byung-ryeol (Hangul: 최병렬; Hanja: 崔秉烈; 16 September 1938 – 2 December 2022) was a South Korean politician and reporter who was the last appointed Mayor of Seoul, serving from 1994 to 1995. After leaving office, Choi remained involved in politics as a Member of the National Assembly, eventually holding office as Leader of the Grand National Party.

Life
Choi Byung-ryeol was born on September 16, 1938 in Sancheong, a county in South Gyeongsang Province.

He entered politics as a member of the Democratic Justice Party in 1985 after holding office as Editor-in-Chief of Chosun Ilbo. Under President Roh Tae-woo, he was Chief of Political Affairs and Minister of Cultural and Public Information. From 1994 to 1995, Choi was the 29th Mayor of Seoul. He was succeeded by Cho Soon.

After leaving his position as mayor, Choi was elected as a member of the National Assembly three times in the 14th, 15th, and 16th general elections. He became the Leader of the Grand National Party in 2003.

Choi died on December 2, 2022 at the age of 84.

References

1938 births
2022 deaths
Mayors of Seoul
20th-century South Korean politicians